Michael Ernest Putney, AM (20 June 1946 – 28 March 2014) was a Roman Catholic bishop and a recognized leader of the ecumenical movement in Australia. 

Born in Gladstone, Queensland, Putney attended St. Joseph's Convent (Townsville) for his primary education, and Our Lady's Mount (Townsville) and St. Columban's (Albion Heights, Brisbane) for his secondary education. 

He trained for the priesthood at Pius XII Provincial Seminary at Banyo, and was ordained in 1969. Putney was named titular bishop of Mizigi and auxiliary bishop of the Archdiocese of Brisbane (Queensland, Australia) in 1995. In 2001, Putney was named bishop of the Roman Catholic Diocese of Townsville, succeeding Bishop Raymond Conway Benjamin. 

Putney was well known for his ecumenical outreach to other Christian denominations and was president of the National Council of Churches in Australia from 2009 to 2013.    

Putney was appointed Member of the Order of Australia in the 2013 Queen's Birthday Honours for "significant service to the Catholic Church in Australia, to the promotion of inter-faith dialogue, and to the community of Townsville", and his life and work is also remembered in the annual Bishop Michael Putney Lecture, sponsored by Queensland Churches Together and the Brisbane Roman Catholic Council for Ecumenism and Inter Religious Relations.

Death
Bishop Putney was diagnosed with terminal stomach cancer in December 2012, and eventually died in office, having worked up until his admission to the hospital on 21 March 2014 (according to Australia's ABC), passing away 15 months after his diagnosis at the Mater Hospital, Townsville, on Friday, 28 March 2014, aged 67.

Notes

1946 births
2014 deaths
People from Queensland
Roman Catholic bishops of Townsville
Deaths from cancer in Queensland
Deaths from stomach cancer
20th-century Roman Catholic bishops in Australia
21st-century Roman Catholic bishops in Australia
Members of the Order of Australia